Verkhneshakarovo (Ürge Şäkär) is a rural locality (a village) in Saraysinsky Selsoviet, Sterlibashevsky District, Bashkortostan, Russia. The population was 168 as of 2010. There is 1 street.

Geography 
Verkhneshakarovo is located 33 km southeast of Sterlibashevo (the district's administrative centre) by road. Nizhneshakarovo is the nearest rural locality.

References 

Rural localities in Sterlibashevsky District